Miss Earth 2007, the 7th edition of the Miss Earth pageant, was held on November 12, 2007 at the University of the Philippines Theater, inside the campus of the University of the Philippines Diliman in Quezon City, Philippines. 30 delegates also visited Nha Trang, Vietnam. 88 delegates competed for the title, making 2007 the largest edition of delegates for Miss Earth. The pageant was hosted by MTV Asia VJ Greg Uttsada Panichkul, Priscilla Meirelles and Ginger Conejero. Hil Hernández from Chile crowned her successor Jessica Trisko from Canada the end of the event.

Pooja Chitgopekar from India won her second consecutive Miss Air title (first runner-up). Silvana Santaella from Venezuela was proclaimed Miss Water (second runner-up). She also won two special awards: Best in Swimsuit and Best in Long Gown. Ángela Gómez from Spain finished fourth as Miss Fire (third runner-up). Bokang Montjane from South Africa made the top 16 semi-finalist and received the Beauty for a Cause award. Montjane became the second winner of this award, after Vida Samadzai from Afghanistan won the first Beauty For a Cause award in 2003.

Results

Placements

Special awards
The following special awards were officially awarded during the grand coronation night:

Awards in Philippines

Awards in Vietnam

Order of announcements

Top 16

Top 8

Top 4

Hosts

Background music
 Opening: "Woman of the Earth" by Samantha Monzon (English and Spanish)
 Swimsuit Competition: "Mama Say" (Original Mix) by Alez del Toro
 Evening Gown Competition: "I'll Take Care Of You" and "My Kind Of Girl" by Richard Poon (Live Performance)

Judges

Contestants
List of countries and delegates that participated in Miss Earth 2007:

  – Shpresa Vitia
  – María Antonella Tognolla
  – Victoria Louise Stewart
  – Sharon Eula Rolle
  – Melissa Cardaci
  – Leilah Pandy
  – Carla Loreto Fuentes Rivero
  – Dženita Dumpor
  – Millicent Ollyn
  – Patrícia Andrade
  – Pauline Marcelle Kack
  – Jessica Trisko
  – Yu Peipei
  – Mileth Johana Agámez
  – Natalia Salas Mattey
  – Ariana Barouk
  – Eva Čerešňáková
  – Trine Lundgaard Nielsen
  – Themys Febriel
  – Verónica Ochoa Crespo
  – Julia Ayala
  – Clair Cooper
  – Nardos Tafese
  – Minal Maneesha Ali
  – Anna Pohtimo
  – Alexandra Gaguen
  – Nanka Mamasakhlisi
  – Sinem Ramazanoglu
  – Diana Naa Blankson
  – Virgine Mulia
  – Jessica Scheel
  – Fan Miao-Meng
  – Katrín Dögg Sigurdardóttir
  – Pooja Chitgopekar
  – Artri Sulistyowati
  – Mor Donay
  – Bernadette Mazzù
  – Ryoko Tominaga
  – Zhazira Nurkhodjaeva
  – Volen Auma Owenga
  – Ji-eun Yoo
  – Ilze Jankovska
  – Amale Al-Khoder
  – Telena Cassell
  – Monika Baliunaite
  – Zhang Xiao-Yu
  – Dorkas Cheok
  – Élodie Delor
  – María Fernanda Cánovas
  – Bandana Sharma
  – Milou Verhoeks
  – Claire Kirby
  – Iva Grijalva Pashova
  – Stacey Garvey
  – Shevalyn Maika
  – Aine Gormley
  – Margaret Paulin Hauge
  – Griselda Quevedo
  – Odilia Garcia
  – Jeanne Harn
  – Barbara Tatara
  – Alina Gheorge
  – Maurielle Nkouka Massamba
  – Oneka McKoy
  – Nicole Chen Lin
  – Theresa Turay
  – Barbora Palovičová
  – Tanja Trobec
  – Bokang Montjane
  – Ángela Gómez
  – Safyra Duurham
  – Ivana Gagula
  – Stefanie Gossweiler
  – Sonya Lee
  – Angel Kileo
  – Jiraporn Sing-ieam †
  – Tenzin Dolma
  – Carleen Ramlochansingh
  – Tameka Deveaux
  – Hellen Karungi
  – Galyna Andreeva
  – Lisa Forbes
  – Je T'aime Cerge
  – Silvana Santaella
  – Trương Tri Trúc Diễm
  – Sarah Fleming
  – Sphiwe Benasho
  – Nyome Omar

Notes

Debuts

Returns

Last competed in 2001:
 
Last competed in 2002:
 
Last competed in 2003:
 
Last competed in 2004:
 
Last competed in 2005:

Withdrawals

Replacements
  – Kelly Kampton is replaced by Angel Kileo.

Did not compete
  – Nadege Herrera

References

External links

 

2007
2007 in the Philippines
2007 in Vietnam
2007 beauty pageants
Beauty pageants in the Philippines